George Jackson, (born 31 July 1962) is a British professor of chemical physics in the Department of Chemical Engineering at Imperial College London. He is noted for developing molecular models that describe the thermodynamic properties of complex fluids; as one of the developers of statistical associating fluid theory (SAFT); and for his work in molecular systems engineering. His theoretical work has found a wide range of practical  applications in industries such as gas extraction and emerging fields like carbon capture and storage.

Early life and career 

Jackson was born in Spain and grew up in Switzerland. He took a B.Sc. in chemistry at Chelsea College (1980-1983), followed by a D.Phil. in Physical Chemistry at Exeter College, University of Oxford (1983-1986). After postdoctoral work at Cornell University with Keith E. Gubbins (1986-1989), he became a lecturer and reader in physical chemistry at the University of Sheffield (1989-1998), and has been professor of Chemical Physics at Imperial College London since 2001.

Research interests 

Jackson's research centres on developing simplified but realistic mathematical models of complex fluids, which are used in industries such as pharmaceuticals, cosmetics, gas extraction, and carbon capture. In the late 1980s and early 1990s, he was one of the developers of the influential statistical associating fluid theory (SAFT), an equation of state that predicts the thermodynamic properties of complex fluid mixtures.

Awards 

Jackson has won numerous honours and awards including a Research Excellence Award in 2009, a Guggenheim Medal awarded by the Institution of Chemical Engineers in 2014, and the Bakhuis Roozeboom Medal by the Royal Netherlands Academy of Arts and Sciences in 2019. He was elected a Fellow of the Royal Society of Chemistry in 1995 and a Fellow of the Royal Society in 2020.

Selected publications

References

External links

 

1962 births
Living people
Academics of Imperial College London
Alumni of Exeter College, Oxford
British chemists